Wilbert Roget II (born December 7, 1983) is an American composer known for his work on video game music, particularly Mortal Kombat 11 (2019), Call of Duty: WWII (2017), and Lara Croft and the Temple of Osiris (2014). His scores have won multiple awards and nominations from the Game Audio Network Guild and the Academy of Interactive Arts and Sciences.

Early life and education 

Roget grew up in Philadelphia and starting playing piano at the age of four. He became interested in the possibilities of cinematic storytelling in video games during high school, and found particular inspiration in Japanese video game and anime soundtracks such as Nobuo Uematsu's and Hitoshi Sakimoto's music for the Final Fantasy series and Yoko Kanno's music for Cowboy Bebop. He earned a BA in music at Yale University in 2005, studying with composition faculty including Kathryn Alexander and Matthew Suttor.

Career 

Roget joined LucasArts as a staff composer in 2008, where he scored Star Wars franchise games including Star Wars: The Old Republic and served as music editor on various titles. His final soundtrack for LucasArts was the unreleased Star Wars: First Assault, a live orchestral score recorded by the London Symphony Orchestra at Abbey Road Studios. He then left LucasArts to pursue a freelance career.

Working freelance, Roget has scored major titles such as Call of Duty: WWII, Lara Croft and the Temple of Osiris, and Mortal Kombat 11, as well as independent titles such as Anew: The Distant Light. He often records his own flute, keyboard, accordion, and guitar parts. When discussing his influences, he often cites classical music; for example, his Call of Duty score was influenced by Claude Vivier's "Zipangu," Toru Takemitsu's "Requiem for String Orchestra," and Krzysztof Penderecki's "Threnody for the Victims of Hiroshima." In Forbes, Erik Kain declared that the Call of Duty score made him "an instant fan."

Roget is also a sample library developer, and products from his audio software company Impact Soundworks are widely used in film and video game composition.

Although Roget works primarily in the music industry, he is also active in academic music programs. He served as visiting faculty at the San Francisco Conservatory of Music from 2018-2019 in the Department of Technology and Applied Composition, and has guest lectured at Yale University and the University of Rochester. In 2016, he completed a solo carillon commission, Island Stones, for the University of Michigan School of Music, Theatre & Dance. He has also given talks and appeared on panels at the Game Developers Conference, ASCAP Expo, PAX, PAX Dev, and MAGFest.

Awards and recognition 

Roget's scores have earned multiple awards and nominations from the Game Audio Network Guild (GANG) and the Academy of Interactive Arts and Sciences (D.I.C.E. Awards). In 2018, he swept the GANG Awards for Music of the Year, Best Interactive Score, Best Original Instrumental (tied), Best Game Audio Article/Publication, and Best Soundtrack Album for his Call of Duty: WWII soundtrack, which was also nominated for the D.I.C.E. Award in "Outstanding Achievement in Original Music Composition." In 2014, his soundtrack for Lara Croft and the Temple of Osiris was nominated for the D.I.C.E. Award in Outstanding Achievement in Original Music Composition and the GANG Awards for Music of the Year and Best Original Instrumental. In 2012, his soundtrack for Star Wars: The Old Republic won the GANG Award for Best Original Instrumental. In 2009, his soundtrack for Star Wars: The Force Unleashed was nominated for three GANG Awards. He also received GANG Awards in 2011, 2010, and 2006.

Discography

Composer

Other credits

References

External links 

 Official website

1983 births
21st-century American composers
21st-century American male musicians
African-American composers
African-American male composers
Composers for carillon
Living people
Musicians from Philadelphia
People from Philadelphia
Video game composers
Yale College alumni
21st-century African-American musicians
20th-century African-American people